Pongello is a small village in Graubünden, Switzerland. It is the ancestral place of the Pontisella family, which was already famous in the 13th century. It lies above Vicosoprano towards Roticcio.

Literature 
Lutz, Markus: Geographisch-Statistisches Handlexikon der Schweiz für Reisende und Geschäftsmänner ... nebst einem Wegweiser durch die Eidsgenossenschaft sammt Nachrichten für Reisende über Postenlauf, Geldeswerth und Gasthöfe. (1822)

References 

Villages in Switzerland